Jeffrey Thomas Lewis (born March 24, 1970) is an American real estate speculator, interior designer, and television and radio personality. He is best known for his Bravo channel reality show Flipping Out and radio show Jeff Lewis Live.

Early life and education 
Lewis was born in Orange County, California. His father is Tom Lewis, who is also a real estate investor.  His mother is deceased. He attended Mater Dei High School.

Career

Real estate 
After graduating from college in 1993, Lewis worked for a real estate broker as a licensed real estate salesperson in California. Lewis has flipped dozens of homes in Los Angeles, his latest being a 4,300 square foot contemporary home he listed in 2018 for $7,995,000. In 2019, he re-listed the home for $6,995,000. Lewis also owns the home next door that he acquired for $3,125,000 in 2016.

Interior design
Lewis started his own design firm in 2009. In 2010 he was asked by House Beautiful to design their "Kitchen of the Year", which was showcased at Rockefeller Center. Since 2013, he has created lines of products for homes such as paints, rugs, tiles, and doors.

Television 
Flipping Out debuted on July 31, 2007. The show focuses on Lewis' flip projects and his interior design business. The tenth season premiered on August 17, 2017. A spinoff, Interior Therapy with Jeff Lewis debuted on Bravo on March 14, 2012 and ran for two seasons. His series Hollywood Houselift with Jeff Lewis premiered on Freevee on June 10, 2022. He was also a regular panelist on the show Property Envy.

Radio
Lewis hosts a radio show, Jeff Lewis Live, on Andy Cohen's Sirius XM Radio Andy network. Jeff's followers are known as "Chumps."

Personal life 
Lewis was in a relationship with his business manager, Gage Edward. They had a baby via surrogate, born on October 25, 2016. They separated on 31 January 2019 after being together for ten years. They share custody of their daughter. In March 2019, he started dating Scott Anderson, but announced on his radio show in September 2020 that they had broken up. 

Lewis was diagnosed with obsessive-compulsive personality disorder in his twenties.

References

External links
 
 
 Jeff Lewis Live on Sirius 

1970 births
American interior designers
LGBT people from California
Living people
Participants in American reality television series
People from Orange County, California
People with obsessive-compulsive personality disorder
University of Southern California alumni